Everett Lee Elkins (November 17, 1917 – June 8, 1977) was an American football back. 

A native of Hamlin, West Virginia, he attended Marshall College. He played college football as a fullback at Marshall. He led the nation in scoring through most of the 1938 season but dropped to second when Marshall's final game was cancelled due to snow. He finished the year with 15 touchdowns in nine games.

He was drafted by the Chicago Cardinals with the 151st pick in the 1939 NFL Draft. He played for the Chicago Cardinals during the 1940 season.

O'Neal died in 1977 in Hamlin, West Virginia.

References

1917 births
1977 deaths
American football fullbacks
Chicago Cardinals players
Marshall Thundering Herd football players
People from Hamlin, West Virginia
Players of American football from West Virginia